The 1874 North Lancashire by-election was fought on 26 March 1874.  The by-election in the North Lancashire constituency was fought due to the elevation to the peerage of the incumbent Conservative MP, John Wilson-Patten.  It was won by the Conservative candidate Thomas Henry Clifton who was unopposed.

References

1874 elections in the United Kingdom
1874 in England
1870s in Lancashire
By-elections to the Parliament of the United Kingdom in Lancashire constituencies
Unopposed by-elections to the Parliament of the United Kingdom in English constituencies